The Saco River (Abenaki: Sαkóhki) is a river in northeastern New Hampshire and southwestern Maine in the United States. It supplies drinking water to roughly 250,000 people in thirty-five towns; and historically provided transportation and water power encouraging development of the cities of Biddeford and Saco and the towns of Fryeburg and Hiram. The name "Saco" comes from the Eastern Abenaki word [sɑkohki], meaning "land where the river comes out". The Jesuit Relations, ethnographic documents from the 17th century, refer to the river as Chouacoet.

Course
The river rises at Saco Lake in Crawford Notch in the White Mountains and flows generally south-southeast through Bartlett and Conway in Carroll County, New Hampshire before crossing into Oxford County, Maine.

Shortly after entering Fryeburg, Maine, the river branches into the "Old Course" Saco River and the more commonly used "Canal River". The two channels merge again near Lovell, Maine.

After running through six hydropower stations operated by NextEra Energy Resources (including Skelton Dam and Bonny Eagle Dam), the river enters York County, crosses under Interstate 95, and passes between Saco and Biddeford, where it is bridged by U.S. Route 1. It enters Saco Bay on the Atlantic with Camp Ellis in Saco on the north shore and Hills Beach in Biddeford on the south shore.

Stream flow
The United States government maintains two stream gauges on the Saco river.

Attractions

The Saco is a popular recreational river, drawing an estimated 3,000 to 7,000 people per summer weekend, mostly on the stretch from Swan's Falls (a campground formerly maintained by the Appalachian Mountain Club and now maintained by the Saco River Recreation Council), to Brownfield, Maine.

There are many sand beaches along the Saco when not at flood stage and camping is allowed along some of these beaches for free.  Misuse, including large quantities of garbage left behind by users and illegal fires, as well as discourtesy toward landowners, has led many beaches to be posted and monitored.  A permit is required from the State of Maine for campfires along any unposted river beaches.

The Saco is a major attraction for canoeists. One area of the river, Walker's Rip, is a set of rapids that has caused less talented canoers to capsize, although it can be navigated successfully.  Several canoeing rentals are available throughout the river's distance.

The Saco River is also famous for sport fishing, even though the number of fish in it has decreased tremendously throughout time.

Problems
Multiple violent and reportedly alcohol-related incidents in 2001 led to increased police patrols and efforts by livery companies, landowners, and government agencies to improve conditions.

Major tributaries

Listed from source to mouth:
Dry River (left)
Sawyer River (right)
Rocky Branch (left)
Ellis River (left)
East Branch Saco River (left)
Swift River (right)
Old Course Saco River (left)
Shepards River (right)
Tenmile River (right)
Hancock Brook (left)
Ossipee River (right)
Little Ossipee River (right)

See also

List of rivers of Maine
List of rivers of New Hampshire

References

External links

 EPA Saco River Watershed Profile
 Saco River Profile at MaineRivers.org
 Real-time flow data for the Conway, NH and Cornish, ME gages
 Saco River Corridor Commission
 Saco River Cleanup, an annual event sponsored by the Saco River Recreation Council
 "Popular river struggles with balancing act", Portland Press Herald, Aug. 11, 2002

 
Rivers of Carroll County, New Hampshire
Rivers of Oxford County, Maine
Rivers of York County, Maine
Maine placenames of Native American origin
New Hampshire placenames of Native American origin